Tri razy svitá ráno is a 1962 Czechoslovak film. The film starred Josef Kemr.

References

External links
 

1962 films
Czechoslovak drama films
1960s Czech-language films
Czech drama films
1960s Czech films